Ahsan Kareem is the Robert M. Moran Professor of Engineering in the Department of Civil & Environmental Engineering and Earth Sciences (CEEES) at the University of Notre Dame. He is Director of the Nathaz Modeling Laboratory and served as the past Chair at the Department of CEEES at the University of Notre Dame.

The focus of his work is on quantifying load effects caused by various natural hazards on structures and to develop innovative strategies to manage and mitigate their effects. The characterization and formulation of dynamic load effects due to wind, waves and earthquakes on tall buildings, long-span bridges, offshore structures and other structures is carried out via fundamental analytical computational methods, and experiments at  laboratory, and full-scale. He directs NatHaz Group (NatHaz Modeling Laboratory) which focuses on developments in cyberspace virtual collaborative research platforms, e.g.,  virtual organizations, crowdsourcing, computational intelligence, living laboratories, sensing and actuation, citizen sensing, web-enabled analysis and design, scientific machine learning (SciML) and cloud-based computing.

His fundamental contributions to aerodynamics and aeroelasticity has led to advances in the analysis, design and performance assessment of tall buildings and long span bridges, high speed train aerodynamics, and land based and floating wind turbines. He has conducted from wind tunnel modeling to stochastic and CFD (Computational Fluid Dynamics)  based simulations and finally to the full-scale monitoring of some of the signature buildings around the world including more recently Burj Khalifa. It utilizes a novel “SmartSync” system featuring “Internet-of-Things” (IoT) concept with built in layers of intelligence for data management and analysis. He has advanced models for damping in tall buildings and motion mitigation devices like tuned liquid dampers from design, prototype testing to post installation monitoring in buildings in the US and in the Pacific-rim. His contributions towards database assisted design through a web-portal recommended in ASCE 7 is used worldwide for designing tall buildings. More recently, his group has embarked on shape optimization of tall buildings based on CFD with embedded topology optimization to configure efficient and optimal structural system for super tall buildings and long span bridges. He has developed prediction methods for quantifying hydrodynamic load effects and the attendant evaluating the response of complaint offshore structures under extreme environments and service loads. He has also contributed to a wide range of topics in the areas of offshore dynamics.

He introduced the use of the Wavelet and Shapelet transforms to signal processing and feature extractions and advanced the use of Volterra systems, POD, ICA, PCA and DMD for data analysis and modeling.  He developed efficient simulation schemes for random vector processes: stationary/non-stationary; Gaussian/Non-Gaussian; Conditional/Un-Conditional utilizing spectral and time-series methods in conjunction with a novel scheme named “Stochastic Decomposition. He developed wind load models for non-synoptic winds like thunderstorms and downbursts and introduced the concept of Gust Front Factor and also developed models for hurricane wind field kinematics and dynamics. He developed safety and risk assessment schemes, performance-based design approach for wind effects and impact of climate change. In the area of Data Analytics and Machine Learning, he has contributed to data analytics, supervised, unsupervised and reinforcement learning; Bayesian Deep Convolution Neural Networks for random fields; Bayesian Deep learning; Dynamic Mode Decomposition; Surrogate Modeling with applications to structural engineering and dynamic loading; Digital Virtual Twins;  Fusion of CFD, Stochastics, Machine Learning and beyond; Autonomous morphing of structures through sensing, computations and actuation.

In 2009, Kareem was elected a member of the National Academy of Engineering for contributions to analyses and designs to account for wind effects on tall buildings, long-span bridges, and other structures. He currently serves as the President of the International Association for Wind Engineering. He was also the former President of the American Association for Wind Engineering.

Awards and honors

Membership to Academies of Engineering 
 2009, Member, US National Academy of Engineering (NAE)
 2017, Foreign Member, Chinese Academy of Engineering
 2020, Foreign Member, The Engineering Academy of Japan (EAJ)
 2010, Foreign Fellow, Indian National Academy of Engineering (INAE)

Medals 
1968: Greaves Cotton & Co., UK, Gold Medal for being the Best Civil Engineering Graduate, Pakistan University of Engineering and Technology 
2002: Jack E. Cermak Medal, ASCE
2005: Robert H. Scanlan Medal, ASCE
2007: A. G. Davenport Medal, International Association for Wind Engineering Senior Research Award
2015: Theodore von Kármán Medal, ASCE
2015: James Croes Medal, ASCE
2017: Masanobu Shinozuka Medal, ASCE
2019: Earnest Howard Medal,ASCE
2021: Nathan M. Newmark Medal, ASCE
2022: James Croes Medal, ASCE

Other prizes, awards and honors 
1984: Presidential Young Investigator Award
 2008: ASCE Civil Engineering State-of-the-Art Award
 2009: Research Achievement Award, 9th Annual University of Notre Dame Research Achievement Award
 2010: Elected Distinguished Member of ASCE
 2011: Inducted to the Offshore Technology Conference Hall of Fame, ASCE/COPRI
 2012: Inducted Honorary Member of the Japan Association for Wind Engineering
 2013: Distinguished Research Award, International Association of Structural Safety and Reliability
 2016: Alfred Noble Prize, ASME, IEEE, ASCE
2020: The International Award of Merit in Structural Engineering, IABSE
2023: Inaugural International award by the Chinese Society for Vibration Engineering (CSVE)
2023: Elected American Association for the Advancement of Science (AAAS) lifetime fellow

Honorary and guest professorships 
 2010: Honorary Professor of Tongji University, Shanghai, PROC
 2012-2018: Honorary Professor, Hong Kong Polytechnic University, HK
 2014: Visiting Professor, Beijing Jiatong University, Beijing, China
 2016: Honorary Professor, Central South University, Changsha, China.
 2017: Guest Professor, Chongqing University, Chongqing, China
 2017: Honorary Professor, Southeast University, Nanjing, China
2020: Honorary Professor, Tsinghua University, China
2021: Qiushi Chair Professor of Zhejiang University, Hangzhou, China

References

Living people
University of Notre Dame faculty
21st-century American engineers
Members of the United States National Academy of Engineering
Foreign members of the Chinese Academy of Engineering
Year of birth missing (living people)
University of Engineering and Technology, Lahore alumni
Pakistani emigrants to the United States
American academics of Pakistani descent